Mycale may refer to:

 Mycale, a mountain in Turkey
 Mycale (genus), a genus of demosponges in the family Mycalidae
 Mycale (vocal ensemble), an American avant-garde vocal group